Oskar-Fredriksborg is a locality situated in Vaxholm Municipality, Stockholm County, Sweden with 722 inhabitants in 2010.

References 

Populated places in Vaxholm Municipality